Radovan Mitrović is an Austrian footballer who plays as a midfielder who currently plays for the Austrian club SV Wimpassing. He is of Serbian descent.

References 

Living people
1992 births
Austrian footballers
Austrian expatriate footballers
Association football midfielders
FC Emmen players
FC Utrecht players
SV Horn players
Eerste Divisie players
Austrian expatriate sportspeople in the Netherlands
Expatriate footballers in the Netherlands
Austrian people of Serbian descent